Waleffe Castle is a castle in Belgium.

See also
List of castles in Belgium

Castles in Belgium
Wallonia's Major Heritage